Otrazhenie was a Belarusian heavy metal band from the  city of Mozyr, the first professional independent (not state sponsored) Belarusian rock band.

Early years (1978–1982)
Otrazhenie was found in 1978 by Vasiliy Kondratyuk and Vladimir Klimenko in Mozyr, Belarus to perform  in the dancing hall in Phov. The band's first lineup also included drummer Michael Usov and keyboardist Anatoly  Martinovich.

Productive period (1983–1999)
In 1982 Klimenko, Koifman and Martinovich returned from army service and reunited with the band, substituting Brusovanik and Kudryavtsev. At the same time a vocalist Leonid Kononov joined the band. In 1985 Otrazhenie released its first album. The band was handed an ideology crisis, as one of the journalists revealed a bracelet, worn by Kolesnikov around his arm as a symbol of capitalist decadence. At the end of 1988 Otrazhenie released its second album In the Hall of the Mountain King in  Moscow.

Current state
For the last several years the band was not touring or recording, but occasionally participated in rock festivals as a guest.

Discography
 Мы там, где льют металл ("We're where Metal Melts)  (1987г.)
 В пещере горного короля (In the Hall of the Mountain King)  (1989г.)
 Good bye USSR (1993г.)  England
 Держись, я с тобой! (Hold On, I'm with You)  (2001г.)  Austria

See also
Accent
Aria

References

External links
Ruble Zone
Anatoly Horbach
Michael Brusovanik
Rocknem Festival

Belarusian heavy metal musical groups
Musical groups established in 1978
Musical groups disestablished in 2008
Musical quartets
Soviet heavy metal musical groups